Nigel Barker (birth registered fourth  1955) is an English former professional rugby league footballer who played in the 1970s and 1980s.

Background
Nigel Barker's birth was registered in Pontefract district, West Riding of Yorkshire, England.

Playing career
Barker made his début for Featherstone Rovers on Sunday 25 January 1981, during his time at Featherstone Rovers he scored twelve 3-point tries, and sixteen 4-point tries.

Challenge Cup Final appearances
Barker played  in Featherstone Rovers' 14–12 victory over Hull F.C. in the 1983 Challenge Cup Final during the 1982–83 season at Wembley Stadium, London on Saturday 7 May 1983, in front of a crowd of 84,969.

Testimonial match
Barker's benefit season at Featherstone Rovers took place during the 1991–92 season.

References

External links
Statistics at rugbyleagueproject.org
Nigel Barker at marklaspalmas.blogspot.com
The Story of Wembley 1983. Part I - a featherstone rovers blog
The Story of Wembley 1983. Part II - a featherstone rovers blog
The Story of Wembley 1983. Part III - a featherstone rovers blog
The Story of Wembley 1983. Part IV - a featherstone rovers blog
The Story of Wembley 1983. Part V - a featherstone rovers blog
The Story of Wembley 1983. Part VI - a featherstone rovers blog
The Story of Wembley 1983. Part VII - a featherstone rovers blog
The Story of Wembley 1983. Part VIII - a featherstone rovers blog
The Story of Wembley 1983. Part IX - a featherstone rovers blog
The Story of Wembley 1983. Part X - a featherstone rovers blog

1955 births
Living people
English rugby league players
Featherstone Rovers players
Rugby league fullbacks
Rugby league players from Pontefract